It is almost certain that Prussian King Frederick the Great (1712–1786) was primarily homosexual, and that his sexual orientation was central to his life. However, the nature of his actual relationships remains speculative. Though he had an arranged marriage, Frederick produced no children and was succeeded by his nephew. His favoured courtiers were exclusively male, and his art collection celebrated homoeroticism. Persistent rumours connecting the king with homosexual activity circulated around Europe during his lifetime, but there is less surviving definitive evidence of any sexual relationships of his, homosexual or otherwise. However, in July 1750, the Prussian king unmistakably wrote to his gay secretary and reader, Claude Étienne Darget: “Mes hémorroïdes saluent affectueusement votre v…” (“My hemorrhoids affectionately greet your cock”), which strongly suggests that he was sexually involved with men. Furthermore, at an advanced age, the king advised his nephew in a written document against passive anal intercourse, which from his own experience was "not very pleasant". That he actually did desire men is also clear from statements by his famous contemporaries, Voltaire and Giacomo Casanova, who personally knew him and his sexual preferences. Significantly, Voltaire nicknamed Frederick "Luc". When read backwards, it means "cul" (the vulgar French term for "anus" or "butt"). Frederick himself once shocked a dinner party with a misogynist rant against "ghastly women you smelled ten miles around."

Frederick's sexuality was rejected by professional historians for centuries after his death, but was embraced by homosexual publications of Weimar Germany, which featured him on their covers and praised him for governing while homosexual.

Possible relationships

As a young crown prince, Frederick confided to his mentor, Generalfeldmarschall Friedrich Wilhelm von Grumbkow, that he felt too little attracted to the female sex to be able to imagine entering into a marriage. At age 16, Frederick seems to have embarked upon a youthful affair with Peter Karl Christoph von Keith, a 17-year-old page of his father. Rumors of the liaison spread in the court, and the "intimacy" between the two boys provoked the comments of his sister, Wilhelmine, who wrote, "Though I had noticed that he was on more familiar terms with this page than was proper in his position, I did not know how intimate the friendship was." Rumors finally reached King Frederick William, who cultivated an ideal of ultramasculinity in his court, and derided his son's supposedly effeminate tendencies. As a result, Keith was dismissed from his service to the king and sent away to a regiment by the Dutch border, while Frederick was sent to Wusterhausen in order to "repent of his sin". King Frederick William may have thought that Frederick's relationship with Hans Hermann von Katte was also romantic, a suspicion which may have played a role in Katte receiving a death sentence. 

While confined to Kustrin after the Katte affair, Frederick formed an intimate friendship with Michael Gabriel Fredersdorf, whom Frederick romantically corresponded with and demonstrated frequent concern for. Fredersdorf initially became Frederick's valet, and when Frederick became king he was provided with an estate and acted as factotum and, as some have said, as an unofficial prime minister. In 1789, Frederick's garden inspector and Oberhofbaurat [head of the planning department and building control office] Heinrich Ludewig Manger described Fredersdorf as "the king's darling at the time". Historian Eva Ziebura says: "The two of them probably had sex at the beginning". Later they exchanged very intimate letters about their hemorrhoids, other ailments, potency issues, etc. Another intimate confidante was his equerry: "No lover can be more agreeable and obliging than Frederick with Dietrich von Keyserling", said a councillor of war.

In 1746 Frederick wrote mocking letters to his rather openly gay brother, Prince Henry of Prussia, which were characterized by jealousy for the "handsome Marwitz", a young royal page. One of Henry's favorites, the Queen's chamberlain, Ernst Ahasverus Heinrich von Lehndorff, also recalls this story in his memoirs. The king wrote to his brother on March 3, 1746 from Potsdam: "Your little darling is doing very well and if he stays well behaved, you will see him again soon. At the moment he yearns for love and composes elegies in your honor full of hot kisses, which he intends to give you on your return. I advise you to conserve your strength so that you have enough to assert your love." He also warned his brother about certain young men at court or among the officers he believed to suffer from gonorrhea.

Frederick invited the French philosopher Voltaire to live with him at Potsdam almost immediately after his accession to the throne. Voltaire, who was in a personal creative crisis, was happy to accept the invitation. He only lived in the City Palace for a short time before renting his own house, first in Potsdam and later in Berlin. Their literary correspondence and friendship, which spanned almost 50 years, had begun a few years earlier as a flirtation and maintained a mutual intellectual fascination. Voltaire had just recently distributed Frederick's treatise Anti-Machiavel in Amsterdam to great popularity. Although Voltaire was occasionally thought to have been involved in same-sex relations, especially as a young man, it is highly doubtful whether the two had an intimate relationship. Occasionally to be read such claims were probably meant more polemically than seriously and are mainly due to the exuberant tones of their correspondence which were customary at the time. It wasn't Voltaire's (rather ugly) appearance that attracted Friedrich, but rather his spirit that outshone Europe, which the young crown prince had recognized early on and now wanted to use for his own glory. Frederick wanted to adorn himself with one of the leading European intellectuals. He also appreciated the witty conversation in French and hoped the philosopher would not only enrich the royal academy but also the royal table (which always consisted only of men, just like his father's famous "tobacco club").

Frederick was a passionate supporter of the Enlightenment and Voltaire was its greatest spokesman. This included, for example, the abolition of criminal liability for homosexual acts. Frederick however did not abolish it, but unlike under his father, no death sentence was carried out. As early as 1725 Voltaire had brought about the release of Abbé Desfontaines, incarcerated for sodomy, from prison which the latter had repaid him with ingratitude. Later, in his Dictionnaire philosophique (1752) Voltaire wrote an article about Love in the manner of Socrates, including a list of historical persons who were inclined towards homoerotic love. The final sentence reads: «Enfin je ne crois pas qu’il y ait jamais eu aucune nation policée qui ait fait des lois contre les mœurs» (After all, I don't think there was ever any civilized nation that enacted laws against mores).

However, Frederick found Voltaire difficult to live with in person. In addition, Frederick was often annoyed by Voltaire's many quarrels with his other friends. Voltaire's angry attack on Maupertuis, the President of Frederick's academy, in the form of a pamphlet,  (The Diatribe of Doctor Akakia) provoked Frederick to burn the pamphlet publicly and put Voltaire under house arrest, after which Voltaire left Prussia. When Voltaire left, he took with him poems by Frederick mocking other rulers that could compromise Frederick. Frederick had his agents detain Voltaire in Frankfurt am Main on his way back to France and forced him to surrender the poems. This episode, which has been called a "lover's quarrel", cooled Frederick and Voltaire's friendship.

In his memoirs of 1759, Voltaire lashed out at Frederick with bits, malice and perfidy in order to avenge his quarrels during his time in Potsdam and in particular his ignominious internment in Frankfurt in 1753. The pamphlet also contains plenty of mockery of the homosexuality of the king and many of his courtiers, along with all sorts of risqué details, like the king's eyes being drawn to the male dancers' legs in ballet, Fredersdorf serving the king "in more ways than one to encourage him", etc. Goethe, who read these memoirs not without pleasure, called them "the model of all scandalous writings". In these , he explicitly detailed the homosexuality of Frederick and his closest social circle. He writes: "when His Majesty was dressed and booted, the Stoic gave some moments to the sect of Epicurus; he had two or three favorites come, either lieutenants of his regiment, or pages, or haidouks [Hungarian infantrymen], or young cadets. They took coffee. He to whom the handkerchief was thrown stayed another quarter of an hour in privacy." A copy of the manuscript was stolen, and after Voltaire's death, pirated excerpts from it were published in Amsterdam in 1784 as The Private Life of the King of Prussia. Publicly, Frederick acted unconcerned about the revelations. However, he had its publication suppressed in France, and attempted to suppress it elsewhere as well.

Eventually, both resumed their correspondence, aired their mutual recriminations, and remained on friendly terms until Voltaire's death.

Frederick's writing and predilection for homoerotic artworks

In 1739, Frederick met the bisexual Venetian philosopher Francesco Algarotti, and they were both infatuated. Frederick planned to make him a count. Challenged by Algarotti that northern Europeans lacked passion, Frederick penned for him an erotic poem,  (ambiguously meaning "the pleasure" or "the orgasm"), which imagined what some have described as Algarotti in the throes of sexual intercourse with another partner, a female named Chloris. Not all Frederick scholars have interpreted the poem in such a way; it has also been suggested as describing a liaison between Frederick and Algarotti, especially in view of the fact that the latter was known as "Frederick's swan". Similar poems were written by Frederick. For instance, the fourth canto of his mock-heroic poem Le Palladion (1749) describes the homosexual adventures of his reader Claude Étienne Darget and includes the following blasphemous lines: "The good Saint John, what do you think he did / To induce Jesus to sleep with him in his bed? / And don’t you feel that he knew his Ganymede." In another verse he calls Julius Caesar the "wife of all Romans". However, none of these poems, including La Jouissance, unequivocally exposes Frederick as being involved in such affairs, though they do highlight his homoerotic artistic tendencies.

Frederick also filled his palaces with erotic artworks that reflected his longing for homosexual relationships. The palace gardens at Sanssouci include a Temple of Friendship (built as a memorial to his sister, Wilhelmine) celebrating the homoerotic attachments of Greek Antiquity, which is decorated with portraits of Orestes and Pylades, amongst others. In the New Palace, a showcase palace also located on the grounds of Sanssouci, Frederick kept the fresco Ganymede Is Introduced to Olympus by Charles Vanloo: "the largest fresco in the largest room in his largest palace", in the words of a biographer. In 1747, the king acquired the antique bronze statue of the nude Boy in Prayer, which he thought to represent Antinous, the supposed lover of the Roman emperor Hadrian. The archaeologist Johann Joachim Winckelmann, a pioneering Hellenist and rather openly homosexual, visited Potsdam in 1752 and wrote: "I have seen Athens and Sparta in Potsdam and am filled with an adoring reverence towards the divine monarch", adding: "I have enjoyed lusts that I will never enjoy again".

After his defeat at the Battle of Kolín, Frederick wrote in a letter: "La fortune m'a tourné le dos....[E]lle est femme, et je ne suis pas galant." This has been translated as "Fortune has it in for me; she is a woman, and I am not that way inclined." The original phrase "je ne suis pas galant" is somewhat ambiguous. While it would not be inaccurate to translate it as "I am not a lover/suitor (of women)", it could also be translated as the rather less suggestive, "I am not chivalrous".

Contemporary opinion
"His father Friedrich Wilhelm called the heir to the throne a 'sodomite' and 'effeminate'", says biographer Wolfgang Burgdorf. The historian bundled the same-sex amours of gay Fritz in his Friedrich book. Even during his lifetime, much of European society assumed Frederick was homosexual. According to Johann Georg Ritter von Zimmermann, "Frederick lost a great deal of 'sensual pleasure,' says Mr. Bushing (i.e. Anton Friedrich Büsching), a Prussian ecclesiastic counsellor, 'by his aversion to women; but he indemnified himself by his intercourse with men, recollecting from the history of philosophy, that Socrates was reported to have been very fond of Alcibiades.' Not only Mr. Bushing, however, but also Voltaire, la Beaumelle, the Duke de Choiseul, innumerable Frenchmen and Germans, almost all the friends and enemies of Frederick, almost all the princes and great men of Europe, even his servants, – even the confidants and friends of his latter years, were of opinion that he had loved, as it is pretended, Socrates loved Alcibiades."

Dealing with the "love" of the king, the Austrian writer Joseph Richter felt that Frederick had "lost all feeling for the fair sex" and "believed he could fill the empty moments no better than with Socratic love. Instead of suppressing his lust for a lecherous life, he just gave it another direction. What a woman could have done, a page now did." In his Story of My Life, Giacomo Casanova noted that each member of First Potsdam Battalion "had a gold watch in the fob of his breeches. It was thus that the king rewarded the courage with which they had subjugated him, as Caesar once subjugated Nicomedes in Bithynia. No secret was made of it." When Frederick was in Potsdam, he spent much of his time at Sanssouci with a circle that was exclusively male, and during Frederick's lifetime the phrase  was used throughout Europe to describe homosexual courtiers. 

When towards the end of the Seven Years' War Frederick published a malicious satire against the mistress of Louis XV, Madame de Pompadour, and against the French nation in general, the French minister Étienne de Choiseul wrote a reply which ended with the following verse: « Peux-tu condammer la tendresse, / Toi qui n'en as connu l'ivresse / Que dans les bras de tes tambours. » (Can you damn the tenderness [of the French king] / You who only knew love drunkenness / In the arms of your drummers.)

William Hogarth's painting The Toilette may include a satirical depiction of Frederick as a flautist next to a mythological painting in which Zeus, in the form of an eagle, is abducting his male lover Ganymede – thereby publicly outing him as a homosexual as early as 1744. Of course, word of his sometimes contemptuous treatment of his wife Elisabeth Christine had also got around at the European courts. In 1763, when Frederick, after the Seven Years' War, saw his wife for the first time in six years, he only told her: "Madame has become more stout" and then turned to his waiting sisters.

To muddy Frederick's homosexual reputation, Frederick's physician Johann Georg Ritter von Zimmermann claimed that Frederick had convinced himself that he was impotent due to a minor deformity he had received during an operation to cure gonorrhea in 1733. According to Zimmermann, Frederick pretended to be homosexual in order to appear as still virile and capable of intercourse, albeit with men. This story is doubted by biographer Wolfgang Burgdorf, who is of the opinion that "Frederick had a physical disgust of women" and therefore "was unable to sleep with them". The surgeon Gottlieb Engel, who prepared Frederick's body for burial, indignantly contested Zimmerman's story, saying the king's genitalia were "complete and perfect as those of any healthy man".

Legacy and historiography
Frederick's homosexuality was rejected by professional historians for centuries after his death. In 1921, doctor and amateur historian Gaston Vorberg wrote an essay to debunk ongoing rumors around Frederick's sexuality, asserting that he was heterosexual. For example, Voltaire's malices could be dismissed as obviously driven by vengeful motives without having to wonder if there might be any truth to it. Historian Johannes Kunisch (1937–2015) still insisted that there is "no serious evidence" of Fredericks homosexuality and that contemporary statements about this "facet" of Frederick's nature were "denunciatory". In his youth, for example, the crown prince would have had affairs with peasent 'nymphs', and as a young king he dated the ballet dancer Barbara Campanini. Finally, Kunisch wrote, it was also possible that Frederick only staged his homosexuality, for example to hide impotence. This opinion has been described by others as "hair-raising psychologising, even pathologising ahistoricity". It has also been argued that the king's interest in the ballet dancer Barbara Campanini can be explained by the phenomenon of the often female “gay icons” that is widespread among male homosexuals. According to Frank-Lothar Kroll, Frederick's disposition was significantly less life-determining than that of his brother Henry. He believes that the king was more determined by male maxims than his brother was.

To others it seems that deliberate ignoring of abounding circumstantial evidence is rooted in conviction that a gay ruler would be a disgrace, as if Frederick's homosexuality would shrink his historic size. The myth of one of the greatest war heroes in world history was not allowed to be psychologically deconstructed. It is such multicentennial historiography that today brings so much prominence, including lexical special articles, to a subject, that would play only one role among many in a biography about a contemporary.

In contrast, his homosexuality was embraced by the homosexual publications of Weimar Germany, which featured him on their covers and praised him for governing while homosexual. Thomas Mann had provided an early precursor to this point of view with his essay Frederick and the grand coalition, written in late 1914, at the start of World War I. He contrasted Frederick's soldierly, male drive and his literary, female connotations consisting of "decomposing" skepticism. Vorberg's conclusions were sharply criticized by another amateur historian, Ferdinand Karsch, in the gay publication Die Freundschaft. In 1931, homosexual activist  published the book Intrigue and Love: On Politics and Sexual Life which spent nine pages discussing Frederick and his sexuality. In 1937, the literary writer Jochen Klepper, who was persecuted by the Nazis and ultimately perished, published his successful novel The Father. Novel of the Soldier King, in which he got to the bottom of the traumatic father-son relationship, although only hinting at a homosexual disposition in the son. He concluded that the father's values ​​of discipline, order, and determination eventually prevailed over the son's effeminate tendencies. This was again compatible with the general historiography that Frederick, endowed with these paternal values, successfully used the powerful army his father had built up to transform a backward agricultural state on the periphery into a major European power.

Today's research tries to dig deeper than the superficial question whether or not he had this sexual orientation, emphasizing that it was precisely the effects and consequences of this disposition that had a life-determining effect. Historian Wolfgang Burgdorf suggests that Frederick's abuse and constant public humiliation by his rude and choleric father for being too soft and effeminate, the latter's disappointment at his son's inability to father a successor, his forcing his son to watch his lover's execution by sword, his suggestion even that he should commit suicide, partly explains Frederick's daring policies as king: As if the warlike royal hero wanted to prove to his dead father that he was a tough guy.

References

Sources

Further reading
Alings, Reinhard (2012). “ ‘Don’t ask – don’t tell’ – War Friedrich schwul?” In Friederisiko: Friedrich der Große, exh. cat., Stiftung Preußische Schlösser und Gärten Berlin-Brandenburg, Neues Palais and Park Sanssouci, 28 April–28 October 2012 (Munich: Hirmer, 2012), "Die Ausstellung", pp. 238–247.
Burgdorf, Wolfgang (2011). Friedrich der Große: Ein biografisches Porträt (Freiburg im Breisgau: Herder), 76–103.
Burgdorf, Wolfgang (2020). "Königliche Liebschaften: Friedrich der Große und seine Männer", in Domeier, Norman / Mühling, Christian (eds.), Homosexualität am Hof: Praktiken und Diskurse vom Mittelalter bis heute (Frankfurt am Main and New York: Campus), pp. 133–150.
Krysmanski, Bernd (2022). "Evidence for the homosexuality and the anal erotic desires of the Prussian king", in Does Hogarth Depict Old Fritz Truthfully with a Crooked Beak?  – The Pictures Familiar to Us from Pesne to Menzel Don’t Show This, ART-dok (University of Heidelberg: arthistoricum.net), 24–30. 

Frederick the Great
Frederick the Great
LGBT history in Germany